This is a list of streams and rivers in Eritrea, arranged geographically by drainage basin.  Generally, rivers in Eritrea are divided into three groups: those that drain into Sudan, towards the Red Sea and towards the Afar Depression.  There is an alphabetic list at the end of this article.

Flowing into the Mediterranean
Nile (Egypt, Sudan)
Atbarah River (Sudan)
Mareb River (or Gash River) (only reaches the Atbarah in times of flood)
Obel River
Tekezé River

Flowing into the Red Sea
Barka River 
Anseba River
Zara River
Koka River
Fah River
Mogoraib River
Langeb River
Damas River
Gonfale River
Wokiro River
Wadi Laba River
Haddas River
Aligide River
Barosio River
Guwa River
Comaile River
Saato River

Alphabetic list
Aligide River - Anseba River
Barka River - Barosio River
Comaile River
Damas River
Fah River - Falkat River
Gonfale River - Guwa River
Haddas River
Koka River
Lebka River - Lalake River - Langeb River
Mareb River - Mogoraib River
Obel River
Regali River
Saato River
Tekezé River
Wadi Laba River - Wokiro River
Zara River

See also
List of rivers of Africa

Eritrea
Rivers